The Blue Water Bridge is a twin-span international bridge across the St. Clair River that links Port Huron, Michigan, United States, and Sarnia, Ontario, Canada. The Blue Water Bridge connects Highway 402 in Ontario with both Interstate 69 (I-69) and Interstate 94 (I-94) in Michigan.

Description

The Blue Water Bridges are jointly owned and maintained by Canada and the United States: Federal Bridge Corporation, a Crown corporation of the Government of Canada, is in charge of the Canadian side, while the Michigan Department of Transportation (MDOT) is in charge of the US side. A toll is charged to cross the bridges, which is used to pay for maintenance and operations.

Together, the two bridges connect Chicago and the Midwestern United States with Toronto and the Northeastern United States, one of the four shortest routes of land travel between the US Midwest and Northeast. They are the second-busiest commercial crossing on the Canada–United States border, after the Ambassador Bridge at Detroit-Windsor, and the fourth-busiest overall international crossing in Ontario in terms of total number of vehicles at 4.7 million annually . In Canada, they are the third-busiest bridges after the Champlain Bridge in Montreal and the Ambassador Bridge.

Border crossing

The Port Huron–Sarnia Border Crossing connects the cities of Port Huron, Michigan, and Sarnia, Ontario, at the Blue Water Bridge. Both the US and Canada border stations are open 24 hours per day. The US Customs and Border Protection upgraded its inspection facilities in 2011, and Canada Border Services Agency upgraded its facilities in 2012. In 2017, inspectors at Port Huron processed 1,579,646 cars and 826,288 trucks.

History
A US Port of Entry was established at the location in 1836, when a license to provide commercial ferry service between Port Huron and what then was known as Port Sarnia. The license was issued to a Canadian man named Crampton who operated a sailboat. In the 1840s, a man named Davenport, also from Port Sarnia, operated a pony-powered vessel. Steam-powered vessels and paddle wheelers soon followed, but the first vessel capable of carrying automobiles did not arrive until 1921.

The first bridge was fully opened to traffic on October 10, 1938. The lead engineer was Polish-born Ralph Modjeski. This bridge originally had two lanes for vehicles as well as sidewalks; the latter were removed in the 1980s to make room for a third lane for automobiles. The third lane for each direction started from the apex of the bridge in order to accommodate long lineups entering each side's border crossing.

In 1928, Maynard D. Smith hired a Pennsylvania-based company named Modjeski and Masters to build what would become the Blue Water Bridge. Ralph Modjeski, a Polish-born engineer who would become known as "America's greatest bridge builder", served as lead engineer for the project. In developing a design, Modjeski faced obstacles posed by the U.S. Army Corps of Engineers, which sought to ensure that the St. Clair River remain navigable for military and commercial vessels. Originally, Modjeski proposed a mammoth suspension-style bridge with tall towers and massive cable anchorages; however, because of the  vertical clearance requirement for shipping, he opted instead for a cantilevered through-truss design.

In 1935, the Michigan Legislature passed a law (Public Act 147 of 1935) creating a State Bridge Commission to finance the design and erection of the main bridge structure of the Blue Water Bridge. The commission was approved by the United States Congress in August 1935 (Public Law 411 of 1935). The law permitted the commission to sell bonds that would be repaid by the revenue from the tolls ($0.25 toll for travelers) collected within 30 years. When the bridge and its associated bonds were paid off, Michigan Governor John Swainson used an executive order to cancel the $0.25 toll, eliminating the jobs of toll collectors, which included his own father.

In 1964, the eastern terminus of I-94 was completed at the foot of the Blue Water Bridge on the American side. Traffic volumes steadily increased, spurred by the completion of Highway 402 in 1982 which provided a continuous freeway link to Highway 401 on the Canadian side. In 1984, I-69 was completed to Port Huron which meant that three freeways converged on the three-lane bridge.

Twinning project
As a precursor to the upcoming twinning project, the customs and toll collection booths on both sides were extensively reconfigured in the early 1990s. On the American side, the I-beam girder overpass crossing Pine Grove Avenue was replaced by a much wider embankment, which also added a four-story customs office building in the center. On the Canadian side this necessitated the demolition of the original booths that had been in use since 1938; these were noted for their Art Deco style but they were too low to accommodate semi-trailer trucks which had been directed to the outside.

In 1992, it was determined that traffic on the bridge had exceeded its rated capacity, so bridge authorities decided to add a second span in order to accommodate the higher traffic.

During the debate over the form of the second span from 1994 to 1995, five possible designs were proposed. The parallel chord truss Bridge and the single-span tied-arch bridge proposals were the least popular as they were not visually appealing and dropped from further consideration. Over half of public opinion had favored a duplicate of the first bridge, while the cable-stayed bridge came in second with around 21% thanks to its "dramatic appearance and appeal to engineers because of their high structural redundancy". The Blue Water Bridge Authority had rejected both designs that topped public opinion, because the duplicate bridge would create a false sense of history, while the cable-stayed design would overshadow the existing bridge in height and proportion. The continuous-tied arch design, which was a distant third place in polls, was chosen for two reasons: one was that it blends in with the original span yet stands out on its own, and the other is lower maintenance costs because fewer spans are involved.

The selection of the continuous-tied arch proposal was initially controversial as it did not have much public opinion support, and critics regarded this type as awkward. Consequently, the engineers changed design details to make it complement the existing bridge. For instance the use of concrete piers and steel tower supporting the anchor span, rather than the traditional concrete tower, gave the bridge a "less massive appearance, easing the difficult transition between the approach, anchor and main spans". The engineers also made "the main span attractive, but economical by settling on an innovative low arch design that merges the traffic deck with the bottom structural supporting steel for the portion of the bridge suspended over the water", which "eliminated the need for expensive bracing and contributes to the graceful appearance of the structure", while the flattened arch also better matches the old bridge. For the new bridge approaches the engineers selected concrete hammer-head piers over steel piers and deck trusses, not only for economical considerations, but it also "gives the new bridge a simpler look, making it easier to distinguish the old bridge from the new one" and "contributes to the clean lines of the new bridge and leaves the view of the old bridge's deck trusses uncluttered". Due to each country's manufacturing differences, the Americans used large pre-cast concrete beams (six beams for each segment) for the approaches while the Canadians used concrete pre-cast box girders (three box girders per segment). Despite this, the differing approach spans are the same depth and appear identical from the side view.

The twinning project was a combined effort between Modjeski & Masters (American engineers) and Buckland & Taylor Ltd. (Canadian engineers). During the construction, two temporary masts were erected to assist in the construction of the tied arch; the towers were painted red and lighted, enabling them to be seen from afar. The approaches to the new bridge use box girders, compared to the original which hold up the road deck with trusses.

The second three-lane bridge, just south of the first bridge, opened on July 22, 1997.

Rehabilitation of original bridge
After the new bridge opened for traffic, the original bridge was immediately closed for extensive renovation which involved, among other things, replacement of the bridge deck, guardrails, and lighting. During this period, the new span used a three-lane configuration reminiscent of the one employed on the original bridge. A flyover ramp on the U.S. side temporarily diverted westbound traffic from the new bridge to the toll plaza, which was blocked off after the original bridge was rehabilitated. The original span was reopened on November 13, 1999, making the Blue Water Bridge the largest infrastructure-crossing project in North America.

Since twinning
In 2007, in accordance with Federal Identity Program requirements, the Blue Water Bridge Authority agreed on a name for the federal Crown corporate organization: Blue Water Bridge Canada.

In March 2009, the Canadian government announced that C$13.5 million (US$10.8 million) in funding would be allocated toward upgrading the border crossing facilities at the Blue Water Bridge. The work was scheduled to begin in May 2009.

Construction was also underway in 2011 to widen and improve both Highway 402 on the Canadian side and co-signed I-94/I-69 on the American side approaching the Blue Water Bridge. The projects, completed the following year, added dedicated lanes separating Blue Water Bridge traffic from local traffic.

See also

List of bridges documented by the Historic American Engineering Record in Michigan
List of bridges in Canada
St. Clair Tunnel, a nearby international railroad tunnel
Trussed Concrete Steel Company

References

External links

Aerial views of the Blue Water Bridge
Fishing Reports for the Bluewater Area
Blue Water Bridge 
Michigan Blue Water Bridge Information
PDF: Construction History of the Blue Water Bridges
Information and Tons of Photos of the Original Bridge
Live Traffic Cameras
Historic American Engineering Record (HAER) documentation, filed under Port Huron, St. Clair County, MI:

1938 establishments in Michigan
1938 establishments in Ontario
Box girder bridges in Canada
Box girder bridges in the United States
Bridges completed in 1938
Bridges on the Interstate Highway System
Buildings and structures in Sarnia
Buildings and structures in St. Clair County, Michigan
Canada–United States border crossings
Canada–United States bridges
Cantilever bridges in Canada
Cantilever bridges in the United States
Historic American Engineering Record in Michigan
Interstate 69
Interstate 94
Lake Huron Circle Tour
St. Clair River
Port Huron, Michigan
Road bridges in Michigan
Road bridges in Ontario
Through arch bridges in Canada
Through arch bridges in the United States
Tied arch bridges in Canada
Tied arch bridges in the United States
Toll bridges in Canada
Toll bridges in Michigan
Tolled sections of Interstate Highways
Transport in Sarnia
Transportation in St. Clair County, Michigan
Truss bridges in Canada
Truss bridges in the United States
Steel bridges in Canada
Steel bridges in the United States